Madonna Della Strada or Santa Maria Della Strada (English: Our Lady of the Wayside  or Saint Mary of the Good Road) is a painting of the Blessed Virgin Mary enshrined at the Church of the Gesù in Rome, mother church of the Society of Jesus (Jesuits) religious order of the Catholic Church; it is a variation on the basilissa (imperial) type of icon.

The Madonna Della Strada is the patron saint of the Society of Jesus. The society's founder, Ignatius of Loyola, was said to have been protected by the intercession of the Blessed Virgin Mary during battle in his service as a  soldier.

History
The name goes back to a shrine established in Rome in the 5th century by the Astalli family, originally known as the Madonna degli Astalli, at a crossroads along the ceremonial route of the popes.  The 13th-14th century fresco (a wall painting done on damp plaster) was originally painted on the wall of Saint Mary of the Way in Rome, the church of  the  Society of Jesus (Jesuits), given to Saint Ignatius by Pope Paul III in 1540.

In 1568, Cardinal Alessandro Farnese erected the Gesù Church of Rome, the mother church of the Jesuits, in place of the former church of Santa Maria della Strada. The fresco was moved there in 1575 to a side chapel where Jesuits pronounced their vows. Sometime in the 19th century, the image was transferred to canvas and affixed to a slate panel.

The icon is  located between two altars, the first dedicated to Ignatius of Loyola, the second, the main altar of the Church, dedicated to the Holy Name of Jesus.

The icon was restored in 2006, revealing at least two layers of previous paint, the original art being a fresco which had been detached from a wall and affixed to canvas.

Legacy
The Jesuits celebrate the feast of Our Lady of the Way on May 24.

There is a chapel dedicated to Madonna Della Strada at Loyola University in Chicago, Illinois, at the University of Scranton in Scranton, Pennsylvania, and at Zilber Hall, Marquette University in Milwaukee, Wisconsin.

The Madonna della Strada Chapel is located at the campus ministry center of Le Moyne College.

The Society of the Lady of the Way is a secular institute in Vienna, Austria that follows the spirituality of St Ignatius of Loyola.

See also
 Roman Catholic Marian art
 Patronage of the Blessed Virgin Mary
 List of Jesuit sites

References

Further reading
Almagno, R. Stephen, O.F.M. Editor.  Mary Our Hope: A Selection from the Sermons, Addresses, and Papers of Cardinal John J. Wright. San Francisco: Ignatius Press, 1984. 158f.

Titles of Mary
Paintings of the Madonna and Child
Renaissance paintings
Books in art
Society of Jesus